Maruful Haque is a Bangladeshi professional football coach and former player, who is currently the head coach of Sheikh Jamal DC. 

He is the first-ever South Asian to get a UEFA A license in 2015.

Early stage
Maruful's roots lie in Gafargaon of Mymensingh. He had interests in all kinds of sports in his youth. He played 1st division kabaddi with Zurine Janata Club. He had an offer from 1st division basketball club Dhaka Panthers. Sonali Bank wanted him on its hockey team and BJMC offered him in athletics and 400 meters javelin. However, he chose football for his professional career. Maruful played in Dhaka League for Bangladesh Boys’ Club in 1992–1994. He was called up for the preliminary squad of the Bangladesh U19 team. He regularly featured for his Zilla football team.

He completed his degree from Mymensingh Ananda Mohan College. He earned a BPED from Dhaka Physical Education College in 1993. A year later, Bangladesh University of Engineering and Technology (BUET) hired him as its physical instructor.

He had his first experience with coaching when he lived the double role of being a footballer-cum-coach in Mymensingh Mohammedan. He took part in a five-day coaching course organized by FIFA. Impressed with Maruful's ability, German coach Walter Fizy asked former Bangladesh legend Rahim to motivate Maruful in gaining higher coaching licenses.

Coaching career
Maruful Haque started his coaching career as an assistant coach of Badda Jagarani Sangsad in 2001. In the meantime, he also used to coach different Bangladesh Army football teams. Although he started his professional career as a game & sports instructor in the Physical Education Department of BUET. Since August 1994, he has been coaching and organizing their sports & athletics. Currently, he is the Asst. Director of Physical Education Department of BUET. Under his assistance, Badda Jagarani Sangsad became champion in the First Division of the concurrent league system. In 2008, he made his professional coaching career debut as the head coach of Dhaka Mohammedan.

Dhaka Mohammedan
Maruful got a big break in 2008 when Dhaka Mohammedan team management appointed him as the head coach of the traditional giant. Maruful caught their attention in a tournament organized by them where Maruful's Badda reached the semis. 
He led the club to win Federation Cup in both season. In 2009 his club won the title of Super Cup as Maruf consider this title as his biggest achievement till now. Dhaka Mohammedan become runners-up in both two season of Bangladesh Premier League under his guidance. Surprisingly in his next season, team was unbeaten in the whole league but still have to satisfied with the runners-up position.

Muktijoddha Sangsad
In 2010, he joined another giant of Bangladesh football, Muktijoddha Sangsad KS.
He helped the club to become runners-up in the league as it was his only season in that club.

Sheikh Russel KC
In 2011, he joined the new local giant Sheikh Russel KC. 2011–12 season was not so good for his team as they finish at fifth place in the league and also stopped their run in semi-final of Federation Cup. But in very next season he made history in local football, as his team won the domestic treble during the 2012–13 season. During their treble win, Russel came up on top against rivals Sheikh Jamal Dhanmondi Club in all three occasions.

Sheikh Jamal Dhanmondi
In 2014, he joined the most successful club in the country as a technical director. Later he became the head coach of the club and give them their third Federation Cup title in 2014–15 season. Before that he led the club to win an invitational pre-season tournament in Bhutan called Bhutan King's Cup. The team was unbeaten through the whole tournament. Remaining on the top of the league table after the first leg of the 2014–15 Bangladesh Premier League,  unfortunately, the club parted company from his service.

Sheikh Russel KC
Being sacked after the first leg of 2014–15 Bangladesh Premier League from Sheikh Jamal Dhanmondi Club, he was re-appointed by his previous club Sheikh Russel KC. The team finished in the second position in the league.

Bangladesh national football team
On 24 November 2015 Bangladesh Football Federation announced the name of Maruful Haque as the new head coach of Bangladesh national football team. He has been appointed till 2015 SAFF Suzuki Cup as he promised to give his best in his first national side job.

Arambagh KS
In April 2017, Maruful Haque joins Bangladesh Premier League side Arambagh KS. Arambagh played their first game under him in the 2017 Federation Cup against Dhaka Mohammedan where they lost the match by 2–1. During his first season with the club, Maruful was fined by BFF for breaching disciplinary issues as he locked into an altercation with the supporters and found guilty over the issue.

Maruful led the team to their first-ever domestic silverware in the club's history of about 60 years by defeating defending champion Chittagong Abahani in the final of 2017–18 Independence Cup by 2–0. He developed many talented players at this club like Robiul Hasan, Arifur Rahman, etc. Arambagh finished at 5th in 2018-19 BPL, their best result in the league after 2010 & gained 33 points, the highest in their club history.

He left the club in 2019 after spending two seasons as the club faced some casino scandals.

Chittagong Abahani
In October 2019, Maruful joined Chittagong Abahani as their head coach for the 2019 Sheikh Kamal International Club Cup. He had a very short time for preparation before the tournament. However, he led the team to the final of the tournament with a newly formed squad though they defeated by Terengganu F.C. in the final.

In November 2019, Maruful signed a one-year contract with the port city side for the upcoming season. He became the highest-paid local coach of that season with a record salary of 65 lakh taka.

Bangladesh U23
Following the sacking of Jamie Day, Maruful was named the interim head coach of Bangladesh national u-23 team in late September 2021, one month before the 2022 AFC U-23 Asian Cup qualification. Bangladesh had been drawn with Kuwait, Saudi Arabia and Uzbekistan. Despite of insufficient preparation time and superior opponents, Maruful showed high hopes of qualifying in the final round before the tournament. However, the campaign didn't go well for his side as Bangladesh returned home after losing all the three matches without scoring a single goal, including a massive 6-0 defeat against host Uzbekistan. 

Maruful's interim duty ended after the AFC U-23 Asian Cup qualification and he returned to coach Chittagong Abahani Limited.

Honours

Head coach
Dhaka Mohammedan SC
 Bangladesh Premier League runner up: 2008–09, 2009-2010
 Bangladesh Federation Cup: 2008, 2009
 Bangladesh Super Cup: 2009
Muktijoddha Sangsad KC
 Bangladesh Premier League runner up: 2010-11
Sheikh Russel KC
 Bangladesh Premier League: 2012–13
 Bangladesh Federation Cup: 2012
 Independence Cup: 2012–13
 Bangladesh Super Cup runner up: 2013
Sheikh Jamal Dhanmondi Club
 Bangladesh Premier League: 2013–14
 Bangladesh Federation Cup: 2014–15
 King's Cup (Bhutan): 2014
Arambagh KS
 Independence Cup: 2017–18

Individual
Best Coach: Protiti Pharma Victory Day Football Tournament 2007 Organized by Dhaka Mohammedan 
Best Coach: Bangladesh Sports Writers Association, Dhaka 2009 
Coach of the Year: Bangladesh Sports Award 2011
Best Coach: Bangladesh Sports Writers Association, Dhaka 2013

Managerial statistics

References

External links

1969 births
Living people
Bangladeshi footballers
Bangladeshi football managers
People from Mymensingh District
Bangladesh national football team managers